Leland Bruce Irving (born April 11, 1988) is a Canadian professional ice hockey goaltender, currently an unrestricted free agent. He most recently playing for HC Lugano in the National League (NL). He was a first round selection of the Calgary Flames, 26th overall at the 2006 NHL Entry Draft and played parts of two National Hockey League (NHL) seasons with the team.  He made his NHL debut on December 16, 2011, in a shootout loss to the Florida Panthers and won his first NHL game one week later in his second start, against the Vancouver Canucks.

Early life
As an eight-year-old, Irving was diagnosed with rhabdomyosarcoma, a rare cancer, when a bump resembling an insect bite above his left ear was found to be cancerous. He endured 13 months of chemotherapy to overcome the illness.  He continued to play minor hockey throughout his ordeal, and missed only one practice and one game.

As he grew older, he worked over the summers with the excavation company his father Bruce operated in his hometown of Swan Hills, Alberta.

Playing career
Irving was drafted in the first round, 26th overall, in the 2006 NHL Entry Draft by the Calgary Flames. He played five seasons of major junior hockey in the Western Hockey League (WHL) with the Everett Silvertips. The 2007–08 WHL season was his fifth and final season with the Silvertips; he played 56 games and sported a 2.45 goals against average. He finished his WHL career tied with Bryan Bridges for the league's all-time record for career shutouts with 21 (he was later surpassed the following season by Tyson Sexsmith of the Vancouver Giants).

On January 18, 2007 Irving was signed by the Flames to an entry-level contract. On April 22, 2007 he was assigned to the Omaha Ak-Sar-Ben Knights of the American Hockey League (AHL). He practised with the club, and dressed in two of the final playoff games behind starter Curtis McElhinney. For the 2008–09 season, Irving was assigned to the Quad City Flames, Calgary's AHL affiliate.

An injury to Flames' backup goaltender Henrik Karlsson led to Irving's recall on December 5, 2011.  At the time he was assigned to Calgary, he was the AHL leader in wins (15), shutouts (3) and minutes played (1254). He made his NHL debut on December 16, a 3–2 shootout loss to the Florida Panthers.  Irving made 39 saves in the game, and was named third star. He earned his first win in his second start, a 3–1 victory over the Vancouver Canucks, on December 23.

A restricted free agent following the season, Irving publicly considered signing in Europe if he couldn't get a one-way contract from the Flames, but chose to return to Calgary on a one-year, two-way deal worth $687,500 for an NHL season. Irving returned to Abbotsford for the start of the 2012–13 AHL season due to the NHL labour dispute.  However, a slow start coupled with the outstanding play of Barry Brust and Danny Taylor relegated him to the team's third-string goaltender.

When NHL play resumed, Irving beat out Karlsson for as the job as Flames backup goaltender, but a knee injury to Kiprusoff early in the season elevated him to Calgary's starter. He struggled in the Calgary net and was demoted back to Abbotsford after playing only six games. He posted a 2–1–1 record with a 3.33 GAA and .833 save percentage.

The Flames chose not to sign Irving, who was an unrestricted free agent following the season, to a new contract. Irving opted to go to Finland, signing a tryout agreement with Jokerit of the Liiga. Irving assumed established himself in the starting goaltender role, appearing in 55 games to post 23 wins.

With Jokerit moving to the Russian Kontinental Hockey League, Irving was not re-signed and was again a free agent. On September 9, 2014, Irving was announced to have accepted a professional try-out contract to attend the Tampa Bay Lightning 2014 training camp. Just three days later, Irving opted to decline the Lightning invite in signing a one-year contract in the KHL with Russian club, Salavat Yulaev Ufa.

As a free agent following the completion of his contract with Ufa, Irving returned to North America in agreeing to a one-year contract with the Iowa Wild of the AHL on October 9, 2015. Despite backstopping a languishing team in Iowa, Irving produced a respectable season with 12 in 41 games. As a free agent, Irving decided to play a second stint in Finland with Liiga outfit, KooKoo for the 2016–17 season.

On August 31, 2017, Irving agreed to a one-year AHL contract with the Lehigh Valley Phantoms. Prior to appearing in a game with the Phantoms, Irving was traded to start the 2017–18 season to the San Diego Gulls in considerations of an NHL trade of Dustin Tokarski from the Anaheim Ducks to Philadelphia Flyers on October 9, 2017.

On June 22, 2018, Irving left North America as a free agent after agreeing to a one-year contract with Italian outfit, HCB South Tyrol, who participate in the Austrian Hockey League (EBEL).

International play

 

In June 2007, Irving was named to Team Canada as one of three rotating goalies for the 2007 Super Series between Canada and Russia's national under-20 teams. He made his first appearance in the series, starting game 3 on August 31, 2007. He stopped 32 of 34 shots on goal and was awarded as Canada's Player of the Game. Canada defeated Russia 7-0-1 in eight games.  He was a member of Canada's gold-medal winning team at the 2007 World Junior Championships, but did not appear in a game, as Carey Price played the entire tournament.  As a player eligible to return for the 2008 tournament, he was expected to make the team, but was instead passed over by the coaches.

Personal life
Irving is married to Ashley Irving, and they have three daughters.

Career statistics

Awards and honours

References

External links
 

1988 births
Living people
Abbotsford Heat players
Bolzano HC players
Calgary Flames draft picks
Calgary Flames players
Canadian ice hockey goaltenders
Everett Silvertips players
Ice hockey people from Alberta
Iowa Wild players
Jokerit players
KooKoo players
HC Lugano players
National Hockey League first-round draft picks
People from Barrhead, Alberta
People from Big Lakes County
Quad City Flames players
Salavat Yulaev Ufa players
San Diego Gulls (AHL) players
HCB Ticino Rockets players
Victoria Salmon Kings players
Canadian expatriate ice hockey players in Finland
Canadian expatriate ice hockey players in Russia